Cholet 3rd Canton is a former canton of France, located in the Maine-et-Loire department, in the Pays de la Loire region. It had 28,939 inhabitants (2012). It was disbanded following the French canton reorganisation which came into effect in March 2015.

The canton comprised the following communes:
 Cholet (partly)
 Saint-Christophe-du-Bois
 La Tessoualle

See also 
 Cholet 1st Canton
 Cholet 2nd Canton
 Arrondissement of Cholet
 Cantons of the Maine-et-Loire department
 Communes of the Maine-et-Loire department

References

Cholet 3
2015 disestablishments in France
States and territories disestablished in 2015
Cholet